Drymoea beata is a species of moth in the family Geometridae first described by Francis Walker in 1856.

Description
Upperside of the wings is deep black, with deep bright blue-green disks.

Distribution
This species can be found in Mexico, Honduras and Colombia.

References

Moths described in 1856
Ennominae
Geometridae of South America
Moths of South America